Nannomys is a subgenus of the rodent genus Mus, the mice. They are known as the African pygmy mice. These species are native to sub-Saharan Africa, where they can be found in many types of habitat. There are 20 species.

Species include:
Baoule's mouse, Mus baoulei (Ivory Coast to Guinea)
Toad mouse, Mus bufo (Mountains of Uganda, Rwanda, Burundi and neighboring parts of the Democratic Republic of Congo)
Callewaert's mouse, Mus callewaerti (Angola and Democratic Republic of Congo)
Gounda mouse, Mus goundae (Central African Republic)
Hausa mouse, Mus haussa (Senegal to northern Nigeria)
Ethiopian striped mouse, Mus imberbis (Ethiopia) (formerly classified in its own genus, Muriculus)
Desert pygmy mouse, Mus indutus (Southern Angola to western Zimbabwe and northern South Africa)
Mahomet mouse, Mus mahomet (Ethiopia, southwestern Uganda and southwestern Kenya)
Matthey's mouse, Mus mattheyi (Ghana)
African pygmy mouse, Mus minutoides (Zimbabwe, Southern Mozambique, South Africa)
Temminck's mouse, Mus musculoides (Africa south of the Sahara, excluding the range of Mus minutoides)
Neave's mouse, Mus neavei (Eastern Democratic Republic of Congo to northeastern South Africa)
Free State pygmy mouse, Mus orangiae (South Africa)
Oubangui mouse, Mus oubanguii (Central African Republic)
Peters's mouse, Mus setulosus (Senegal to Ethiopia and western Kenya)
Setzer's pygmy mouse, Mus setzeri (Northeastern Namibia, Botswana, and western Zambia)
Thomas's pygmy mouse, Mus sorella (Eastern Cameroon to western Tanzania)
Delicate mouse, Mus tenellus (Sudan to southern Somalia and central Tanzania)
Gray-bellied pygmy mouse, Mus triton (Southern Ethiopia to central Angola and Malawi)

References

Animal subgenera